Fely Irvine (born 1988/1989) is an Australian actress, singer and dancer.  She was a former member of Hi-5 and became a contestant in The Voice. She left Hi-5 in 2011 after three years with the group. Irvine went on the live in the U.S where sings on the Mastros circuit. She was a contestant on American Idol and made top 60. She replaced Sun Park, who played as Ginger in Gasp! in 2009 and was in turn succeeded by Dayen Zheng in 2012.  Irvine is of half-Filipino and half-Scottish ancestry.

Personal life
Irvine became engaged to Home and Away star Tai Hara in January 2015, and the couple married in Bali in January 2017.

Filmography

References

External links

1989 births
Living people
People from Davao City
Musicians from Sydney
Australian people of Filipino descent
Australian people of Scottish descent
Filipino people of Scottish descent
Australian television personalities
Women television personalities
Australian television actresses
Australian female dancers
Australian children's musicians
Filipino emigrants to Australia
21st-century Australian singers
21st-century Australian women singers
TV5 (Philippine TV network) personalities
Actresses from Sydney